Ola var fra Sandefjord (“Ola was from Sandefjord”) is a 1929 Norwegian song by Einar Rose. It was originally named "My Little Sweetheart". It was one of the most popular songs in Norway in the 1930s. It was composed by Albert Edvin Pedersen and written by Per Kvist.

The Johnny Band revived the 30-year old classic in 1965 and it became one of Norway's best-selling singles. It was awarded Norway's silver record award in 1965 for its number of sales. It sold a total of 48,000 copies.

Background
The song was made famous by the Johnny Band in 1965, a year in which they sold nearly 50,000 copies. The song, which dates to 1929, was originally composed by Albert Edvin Pedersen and the songwriter is Per Kvist. It was originally a Foxtrot and was released the same year by singer Einar Rose. The Johnny Band and John Klemetsen's version of the song is in the genre of Schlager music. The Johnny Band first performed their song at Sandefjord's Park Hotel in 1965 and it quickly became one of Norway's most sold singles. Its original title is “My Little Sweetheart” and the song was originally written for the music contest Jazzmusikkonkurransen 1929, where it came in as number three. The song was first released on a 78 rpm disc record in 1929 by the record company Odeon. The cover version by the Johnny Band sold 48,000 copies soon after their initial concert at Park Hotel.

Charts
The song reached the top ten on the chart in Norway on numerous occasions in the mid-1960s. It was No. 10 in November 1965, and in January 1966, it peaked at No. 4 in Norway. In February 1966, it was No. 6.

The Decca Records cover version by the Johnny Band sold over 25,000 copies and was awarded the official Norwegian silver record award in 1966. It is a family rock or beat music version of the original song and became a breakthrough for the Johnny Band as their biggest hit. The gold and silver record awards had been handed out annually by the newspaper Arbeiderbladet since 1960.

Content

Lyrics and translation
The song text is:

Cover versions
The song has been covered by several artists, including:

 The Johnny Band
 Ivar Ruste
 Rune Rudberg
 Ronald Holmberg
 Zelimir Kulisic
 Arne Mørch

References

Norwegian songs
Norwegian-language songs
1929 songs
1945 singles
Songs about Norway